Poppleton may refer to:

Places 
 Upper Poppleton, North Yorkshire, England
 Nether Poppleton, North Yorkshire, England
 Poppleton railway station, North Yorkshire, England
Poppleton, Baltimore, a neighborhood of Baltimore, Maryland
 Poppleton Township, Minnesota, United States

People 
 Earley F. Poppleton (1834–1899), a politician in Ohio, United States
 Andrew Jackson Poppleton (1830–1896), mayor of Omaha, Nebraska, United States

Other 
Poppleton School, a former school in Troy, Michigan, now at the Troy Historic Village
 Poppleton University, a fictional British university
 Poppleton (book series), a series of children's books about a pig named Poppleton
 Poppleton manuscript, a 14th-century codex